Liquidity is a concept in economics involving the convertibility of assets and obligations. It can include:

 Market liquidity, the ease with which an asset can be sold
 Accounting liquidity, the ability to meet cash obligations when due
 Liquid capital, the amount of money that a firm holds
 Liquidity risk, the risk that an asset will have impaired market liquidity

See also
Liquid (disambiguation)
Liquidation (disambiguation)